The Dearborn Street Bridge over the Chicago River was built in 1962. It connects the Near North Side with "The Loop."  The American Institute of Steel Construction honored the bridge with the 1963 "Most Beautiful Steel Bridge" award in the Movable Span category. The first drawbridge was built at Dearborn street in 1834 when Chicago had a population of 350. It was the primary crossing point over the Chicago River for the original town.

References
 (at author website)

External links

1962 establishments in Illinois
Bascule bridges in the United States
Bridges completed in 1962
Bridges in Chicago
Road bridges in Illinois
Steel bridges in the United States